Pascoe Glacier is a cirque glacier, 1.5 nautical miles (2.8 km) long, which flows into Greenville Valley from the north end of Staten Island Heights, in the Convoy Range, Victoria Land. The name was applied by geologist Christopher J. Burgess, Victoria University of Wellington Antarctic Expedition (VUWAE) party leader in the 1976–77 season. Named after John D. Pascoe (1909–72), New Zealand mountaineer, photographer, and author of books on New Zealand mountains and alpine subjects; Chief Archivist, Department of Internal Affairs, 1963.

Glaciers of Victoria Land
Scott Coast